Ministry of Finance and Economic Affairs may refer to:
 Minister of Finance and Economic Affairs (Gambia)
 Ministry of Finance and Economic Affairs (Iceland)
 Ministry of Finance and Economic Affairs (Sri Lanka)
 Ministry of Finance and Economic Affairs (Tanzania)